Sir James Augustus Grant, 1st Baronet (3 March 1867 – 29 July 1932) was a British Conservative Party politician.

Early life
Born in Jalandhar, India, he was the son of the Scottish explorer James Augustus Grant and his wife Margaret Laurie. He matriculated at Christ Church, Oxford in 1886.

After university, Grant worked in South Africa on the Kimberley–Bechuanaland railway. He accompanied Joseph Thomson on his final expedition of 1890. At this point he was working for the British South Africa Company and Cecil Rhodes, a contact of his father. With Frank Elliott Lochner of the Bechuanaland Police and Alfred Sharpe, Thomson and Grant went to visit Msiri of Garenganze, seeking mineral rights.

Politician
Grant was Member of Parliament (MP) for Egremont from January 1910 until the constituency was abolished for the 1918 general election.  He was then elected as MP for Whitehaven, but lost that seat at the 1922 general election to Labour Party candidate Thomas Gavan Duffy. Grant was strongly opposed to extending the franchise to women. During a parliamentary debate on the bill which became the Representation of the People Act 1918 he said: "We are controlled and worried enough by women, and I have heard no reason why we should alter the present state of affairs."

Grant did not contest the 1923 general election, but returned to the House of Commons at the 1924 general election as MP for South Derbyshire. He retired from Parliament at the 1929 election, having been made a baronet, in July 1926, of Househill, Nairn.

The baronetcy became extinct on Grant's death in Gloucester in 1932, aged 65.

Family
Grant married in 1896 Nina Frances Kennard, daughter of Arthur Challis Kennard and his wife the novelist Nina H. Kennard (1844–1926). Their daughter Nina Margaret Sophie in 1924 married Sir Anselm Guise, 6th Baronet, of Elmore Court, Gloucestershire, and they had two sons and a daughter, including Sir John Grant Guise, 7th Baronet (1927–2007). A younger daughter Hester, born 1899, married in 1923 Arthur Darley Bridge of the Coldstream Guards.

References

Sources

External links 

1867 births
1932 deaths
People from Poplar, London
Baronets in the Baronetage of the United Kingdom
Conservative Party (UK) MPs for English constituencies
Members of the Parliament of the United Kingdom for constituencies in Derbyshire
UK MPs 1910
UK MPs 1910–1918
UK MPs 1918–1922
UK MPs 1924–1929